Texture may refer to:

Science and technology
 Image texture, the spatial arrangement of color or intensities in an image
 Surface texture, the texture means smoothness, roughness, or bumpiness of the surface of an object
 Texture (roads), road surface characteristics with waves shorter than road roughness
 Texture (cosmology), a theoretical topological defect in the structure of spacetime
 Texture (crystalline), material's individual crystallites sharing some degree of orientation
 Texture (geology), a physical appearance or character of a rock
 Texture mapping, a bitmap image applied to a surface in computer graphics
 Soil texture, a relative proportion of grain sizes of a soil
 Scalar field

Arts
 Texture (visual arts), an element of design and its application in art

Music
 Texture (music), an overall sound created by the interaction of aspects of a piece of music
 Textures (album), a 1989 album by Brian Eno
 Textures (band), a metal band from the Netherlands, who formed in 2001 in Tilburg

Other uses
 Texture (app), a digital app giving access to magazines
 Food texture or mouthfeel

See also